Kathleen Guthrie (née  Maltby) (26 February 1905 – 7 September 1981) was a British artist who exhibited with the London Group and at the Royal Academy and also had several solo exhibitions. During a long career Guthrie painted in oils and watercolours, produced silkscreens and murals and wrote and illustrated children's books.

Biography
Guthrie was born in Feltham in Middlesex and attended the Slade School of Art between 1921 and 1923, before attending the Royal Academy Schools for three years. In 1927 she married the artist Robin Guthrie and moved to America with him in 1931 when he became a director of the Boston School of Fine Art. In 1932, while in Boston, Kathleen Guthrie had the first solo exhibition of her career with works shown at the Grace Horne Gallery in that city. The following year the Guthrie's returned to England and settled in Sussex but divorced in 1937.

During World War II, Guthrie submitted several works to the War Artists' Advisory Committee and the Committee did acquire one of the paintings she produced during the conflict, that of a bombed hospital ward. The painting shows the scene in a hospital ward after it has been hit by a bomb that has left a large hole in a wall and mangled beds. The expressions on the faces of the attending staff, and the blood stained sheets, suggest dead or severely injured patients lying on the floor out of sight of the viewer.

Guthrie married the abstract artist Cecil Stephenson in 1941 and the couple settled in Hampstead, where Guthrie completed a mural for a local health centre. She also continued to exhibit on a regular basis. She exhibited with the London Group and at the Royal Academy and held her first solo exhibition in Britain at the Little Gallery in 1947. Her 1951 exhibition at the Crane Kalman gallery in Manchester was well reviewed and considered a great success. Guthrie also wrote and illustrated children's books, most notably with her first published book, The Magic Button which was published in 1958. A subsequent volume, Magic Button to the Moon also contained short poems by Guthrie. After Stephenson's death in 1965, Guthrie reproduced, as silk screens, three of his signature Abstracts designs from 1936, 1937 and 1938. During the 1960s Guthrie produced a further series of abstract silk screens, which she titled Camelot, that featured combinations of fields of pure colour.

References

Further reading
 A Poet's Eye, The Paintings of Kathleen Guthrie by Jonathen Eastway, Cartmel Press (1999)

External links

 

1905 births
1981 deaths
20th-century English painters
20th-century English women artists
Alumni of the Royal Academy Schools
Alumni of the Slade School of Fine Art
British children's book illustrators
British war artists
English children's writers
English women painters
Modern painters
People from Feltham
World War II artists
Writers who illustrated their own writing